"Hello" is a song performed by French DJ and record producer Martin Solveig and Canadian synth-pop band Dragonette, taken from the former's fifth studio album, Smash (2011). The song was released as the album's lead single on 6 September 2010 by Mercury Records.

It is Solveig's most successful single to date, peaking at number one in Austria, Belgium (Flanders), Czech Republic and the Netherlands, while charting within the top 10 in ten other countries. It also reached number one on the Hot Dance Club Songs chart in the United States. Additionally, the song became Solveig's and Dragonette's first appearance on the Billboard Hot 100 in April 2011, eventually peaking at number 46 in June. It has since been certified Platinum by the Recording Industry Association of America (RIAA) for sales of 1,000,000 units.

The song has been featured in 90210, The Vampire Diaries, Gossip Girl, Alvin and the Chipmunks: Chipwrecked, Skins, and Ted Lasso. It was also featured in Tim Hortons' 2013 ad for their 'Roll up the Rim to Win' promotion. It also used as the intro theme to the TV series Cheer! on CMT. The song appears in the video game Dance Central 3.

Music video
The music video is a tennis match scene played on the grounds of the French Open tournament in Paris. There are two variants: a long version which is the first episode of a series of music videos called "Smash", and a short condensed version.

The long version of the music video is divided into two chapters. The first chapter is an introductory dialogue and backstory (by Nelson Monfort) involving two of the main characters, a tennis player named Martin Solveig (as himself) and his tennis coach or manager Lafaille (played by DJ Grégory Darsa).

In Chapter 2 the song plays over a tennis match, recorded live at the main stadium court of the Roland Garros complex, court Philippe Chatrier. The short version consists of a re-cut version of this chapter. In the tennis match, Martin Solveig faces fellow DJ Bob Sinclar. As the match progresses Solveig struggles to gain any points, and is unable to win a game. With the score at 6–0, 6–0, 5–0, Sinclar is about to serve for matchpoint when "She" (Solveig's love interest) enters the crowd, and Solveig decides he must win to impress her. He returns a serve but a lineswoman (Mathilde Johansson) calls the ball out, awarding the match to Sinclar. Novak Djokovic enters the arena and convinces the referee to overturn the call. Solveig makes a strong comeback, rallying to match point. However, Gaël Monfils comes into the stadium and kisses Solveig's love interest. Solveig sees this and decides to (literally) throw in the towel. In the long version only, the video ends with "to be continued" displayed on the screen. This portion of the music video was shot and recorded prior to the 2010 French Open commencing.

Cover versions
The song was covered by The Baseballs on their second studio album, Strings 'n' Stripes. The Chipettes also covered this song as an exclusive iTunes bonus track on the 2011 Alvin and the Chipmunks: Chipwrecked: Music from the Motion Picture soundtrack album. A live performance by the Argentine electropop band Miranda! was also recorded, and later included on their double live-album, Luna Magistral (2012).

Track listings

 French 12-inch vinyl
 "Hello" (Club)
 "Hello" (Dada Life Remix)
 "Hello" (Bassjackers Remix)
 "Hello" (Michael Woods Remix)

 French digital download
 "Hello" – 4:42

 French CD single 
 "Hello" (single edit) – 4:41
 "Hello" (club edit) – 5:33
 "Hello" (Sidney Samson Remix) – 5:18
 "Hello" (Bassjackers Remix) – 5:03
 "Hello" (Michael Woods Remix) – 7:18

 German CD single
 "Hello" (radio edit) – 3:11
 "Hello" (club edit) – 5:33

 U.S. digital download
 "Hello" – 4:41

 U.S. digital EP
 "Hello" (Sidney Samson Remix) – 5:18
 "Hello" (Bassjackers Remix) – 5:03
 "Hello" (Michael Woods Remix) – 7:16
 "Hello" (Michael Woods Dub) – 7:18
 "Hello" (Dada Life Remix) – 5:33

 U.K. digital EP
 "Hello" (UK radio edit) – 2:45
 "Hello" (single edit) – 4:41
 "Hello" (Michael Woods Remix) – 7:18
 "Hello" (Michael Woods Dub) – 7:18
 "Hello" (Sidney Samson Remix) – 5:18
 "Hello" (Bassjacker Remix) – 5:03
 "Hello" (Dada Life Remix) – 5:33

 Summer 11 Remixes
 "Hello" (Caveat Remix) – 6:53
 "Hello" (Dead Battery Remix) – 5:39
 "Hello" (Relanium Remix) – 6:38
 "Hello" (Ken Loi Remix) – 6:15
 "Hello" (Awiin Remix) – 5:47
 "Hello" (MINE Remix) – 6:35
 "Hello" (Singularity Remix) – 7:12
 "Hello" (Pace Remix) – 4:11
 "Hello" (Why Are We Whispering Remix) – 3:04
 "Hello" (Jeremy Ebell Remix) – 2:56

Credits and personnel
 Written by Martin Solveig and Martina Sorbara
 Composed and produced by Martin Solveig
 Published by Dragonette Inc. and Temps D'Avance
 Lead vocals and backing vocals – Dragonette
 Other instruments and programming – Martin Solveig
 Guitar – Jean-Baptiste Gaudray
 Mixed by Philippe Weiss at Red Room Studio, Suresnes
Mastered by Tom Coyne at Sterling Sound, New York City 

Source:

Charts

Weekly charts

Year-end charts

Certifications

References

2010 singles
2010 songs
Dragonette songs
Dutch Top 40 number-one singles
Juno Award for Dance Recording of the Year recordings
Martin Solveig songs
Mercury Records singles
Number-one singles in Austria
Number-one singles in the Czech Republic
Songs written by Martin Solveig
Songs written by Martina Sorbara
Ultratop 50 Singles (Flanders) number-one singles
Song recordings produced by Martin Solveig
Electronic rock songs